Aboubakar Koné (born 1 January 1982) is an Ivorian professional footballer who plays as a striker for Iraqi Premier League club Al-Kahrabaa.

References

External links
 
 

1982 births
Living people
People from Bouaké
Ivorian footballers
Association football forwards
El Entag El Harby SC players
Zamalek SC players
Tala'ea El Gaish SC players
Taliya SC players
Al-Shabab SC (Kuwait) players
Al-Talaba SC players
Al-Kahrabaa FC players
Egyptian Premier League players
Oman Professional League players
Kuwait Premier League players
Iraqi Premier League players
Ivorian expatriate sportspeople in Egypt
Ivorian expatriate sportspeople in Oman
Ivorian expatriate sportspeople in Kuwait
Ivorian expatriate sportspeople in Iraq
Expatriate footballers in Egypt
Expatriate footballers in Oman
Expatriate footballers in Kuwait
Expatriate footballers in Iraq